is a fictional monster, or kaiju, which first appeared in Ishirō Honda's 1963 film Atragon, produced and distributed by Toho. Manda is based on a Japanese dragon, and is depicted as a giant sea-dwelling serpent which can survive on land. Manda's roars were created through recordings of lions bellowing.

Overview
Manda is a giant sea dragon about 150 meters (492.126 feet) long and weighs 30,000 metric tons (33069.339 short tons) in the Shōwa period, and 300 meters (984.252 feet) long & weighs 60,000 metric tons (66138.679 short tons) in Godzilla: Final Wars. Most of Manda’s designs for its appearances are based on a Japanese dragon, except for the ‘Second Generation’ individual seen in Destroy All Monsters, who lacks a mane, horns and whiskers, looking more serpentine as a result.

Shōwa period
In Atragon, Manda is a sea-dwelling dragon that is the guardian of Mu, an underwater kingdom. Manda is one of the primary antagonists along with the Empress. When the submarine warship Gotengo attacks, Manda attacks and wraps its body around the ship, trying to crush it, but the Gotengo discharges electricity on Manda, shocking it. Manda unwraps itself and tries to swim away, but the Gotengo pursues it, later firing its Absolute Zero Cannon to freeze Manda against a seamount.

Manda reappears again on Monsterland (along with several other monsters including Godzilla, Rodan, and Anguirus) in Destroy All Monsters. Aliens called Kilaaks come to Earth and take control of Manda and the other monsters, making them attack cities worldwide (Manda is used to attack London) until the humans manage to free the monsters from the alien mind control. After this, the monsters are sent to fight King Ghidorah, although Manda does not fight in the battle, merely watching from the sidelines with Varan and Baragon. After Ghidorah is killed, Manda and the other monsters return to Monsterland.

The Manda prop used in Destroy All Monsters had no horns or whiskers on its face and the long fuzz running down its back was gone.

Millennium period
In the Millennium series, Manda is the first monster to be killed in Godzilla: Final Wars, playing a minor role, once again as an adversary of the Gotengo. The Gotengo is seen as attacking Manda, which is wrapped around its hull. The submarine manages to shake it off and sails into an underwater volcano to see if it can lure Manda inside. The plan works, but Manda is merely injured, not killed, and continues to pursue the Gotengo. The submarine then turns around and fires its Zero Cannon which hits Manda, causing it to freeze instantly, after which Gotengo uses its drill to easily pierce the frozen Manda, causing the monster to shatter and die. In this movie, Manda, along with Zilla and Kamacuras while flying, is primarily depicted through CGI animation, though shots where Manda is wrapped around the Gotengo use a puppet.

Reiwa period
Manda appears in the two prequel novels to the anime film Godzilla: Planet of the Monsters, which chronicle humanity's war with the kaiju that is briefly touched upon in the film's opening credits. In the novel Godzilla: Monster Apocalypse, Manda inhabits the north Atlantic Ocean and claims the Strait of Dover  as its territory, sinking ships that sail too close. Later the Gotengo engages and kills Manda during "Operation: Eternal Light". However, Manda or another Manda appears in a novel GODZILLA: Project Mechagodzilla, in the Gulf of Persia during "Operation: Great Wall".

Multiple Mandas appear in the Godzilla Singular Point anime series, swimming together in groups. They first appear in the waters off of the Boso Peninsula, attacking fishing boats and being driven into Tokyo Bay by Godzilla's Aquatilis form, with one being dragged ashore and eaten before Godzilla evolving into his Amphibia form. Other Mandas in the group battle Godzilla as he transforms into further forms. As the kaiju problem spreads across the globe, another school of Manda appears in the Strait of Dover and proceeds to swim into London via the River Thames.

Appearances

Films
 Atragon (1963)
 Destroy All Monsters (1968)
 All Monsters Attack (1969, stock footage cameo)
 Terror of Mechagodzilla (1975, stock footage cameo)
 Godzilla: Final Wars (2004)

Video games
 Kaijū-ō Godzilla / King of the Monsters, Godzilla (Game Boy - 1993)
 Godzilla: Monster War / Godzilla: Destroy All Monsters (Super Famicom - 1994)
 Godzilla Trading Battle (PlayStation - 1998)
 Godzilla Defense Force (2019)

Literature
 Godzilla at World's End (novel - 1998)
 Godzilla: Rulers of Earth (comic - 2013-2015)
 Godzilla: Cataclysm (comic - 2014)
 Godzilla: Monster Apocalypse (novel - 2017)

Cultural references
 Manda is used as the name for a giant snake, and boss of the Snake Summons, in the Naruto manga series.
 The Manda prop was reused in episode 6 of Tsuburaya Productions's 1966 series Ultra Q to represent the monster Kai Dragon.

References

Toho monsters
Fictional dragons
Fictional reptiles
Fictional snakes
Godzilla characters
Fictional characters who can move at superhuman speeds
Fictional characters with superhuman strength
Fictional monsters
Mothra characters
Science fiction film characters
Fantasy film characters
Film characters introduced in 1963
Kaiju
Horror film villains